Hercules and the Masked Rider (also known as Goliath and the Masked Rider) is a 1963 Italian peplum film written and directed  by Piero Pierotti and starring Alan Steel and Mimmo Palmara. A crossover film, it is set in the seventeenth century Spain and it features Hercules (Goliath in the original version)  in a Zorro-like scenario.

Plot

Cast
Alan Steel as Hercules/ Goliath 
Mimmo Palmara as Don Juan 
José Greci as Dona Blanca
Pilar Cansino as Estella, the Gypsy Queen
Arturo Dominici as Don Ramiro Suarez
Dina De Santis as Dolores 
Piero Leri as Felipe
Renato Navarrini as Don Francisco
Loris Gizzi as Pedro 
Ettore Manni as Captain Blasco
Tullio Altamura as Ruiz
Ugo Sasso as Hermann
Armando Guarnieri  as Don Alvarez

Release
Hercules and the Masked Rider was released in Italy on 17 November 1963 with an 85-minute running time. It received a release in the United States in 1964 with an 86-minute running time.

Footnotes

References

External links

Italian adventure films
Peplum films
1960s adventure films
Films directed by Piero Pierotti
Films set in Spain
Films set in the 17th century
Films with screenplays by Ernesto Gastaldi
Sword and sandal films
Goliath
1960s Italian films